Truljalia is a genus of crickets in the subfamily Podoscirtinae and tribe Podoscirtini.  Species have been recorded in: India, southern China, Korea, Japan, Indo-China and west Malesia.

Species 
Truljalia includes the following species:
Truljalia bispinosa Wang & Woo, 1992
Truljalia citri (Bey-Bienko, 1956) – type species (as Calyptotrypus citri Bey-Bienko)
Truljalia elongata Liu & Shi, 2012
Truljalia forceps Saussure, 1878
Truljalia formosa He, 2012
Truljalia hibinonis (Matsumura, 1917)
Truljalia hofmanni (Saussure, 1878)
Truljalia hubeiensis Ma & Zhang, 2015
Truljalia lata Ingrisch, 2002
Truljalia meloda Gorochov, 1992
Truljalia multiprotubera Liu & Shi, 2011
Truljalia ornata (Chopard, 1969)
Truljalia panda Ma & Zhang, 2015
Truljalia parvispinosa (Chopard, 1930)
Truljalia tylacantha Wang & Woo, 1992
Truljalia versicolor Ingrisch, 1997
Truljalia viminea Gorochov, 2002

References

External links
 
 

Ensifera genera
crickets
Orthoptera of Asia